Ray Burse, Jr. (born October 2, 1984 in Prospect, Kentucky) is an American former soccer  player.

Career

College and amateur
Burse attended St. Xavier High School in Louisville, Kentucky, and played college soccer at Ohio State University. His 162 career saves and 1.11 goals against average (GAA) has left him as one of OSU's best goalkeepers to date. In high school Burse was named an All-American playing as a forward.

In 2005 Burse also played for Chicago Fire Premier in the USL Premier Development League, finishing the year with an impressive 0.68 GAA.

Professional
Burse was drafted in the third round of the 2006 MLS Superdraft and played on the F.C. Dallas reserve squad. During the 2006 season for FC Dallas, Burse made no first team starts, but was regular on the reserve squad. Burse made his professional debut in Dallas' 1-1 draw with C.D. Guadalajara in the opening match of the SuperLiga on July 24, 2007. He made his first MLS league appearance in a 1-0 win against Colorado Rapids on August 4, 2007. In 2008, he was loaned out to the Portland Timbers of the USL First Division. He returned to Dallas on June 4, 2008, after starting in ten games and recording six clean sheets.  He made his first of two starts on June 1, 2008 in a 2-1 loss against the Colorado Rapids.  Ray served as the backup goalie in 20 regular-season games for FC Dallas during the 2008 MLS regular season.

Burse signed a short-term contract with the Columbus Crew on February 19, 2011  due to injuries to the team's top two goalkeepers  He made two starts for the Black & Gold in both legs of the Crew's 2010-2011 CONCACAF Champions League quarterfinal series against Real Salt Lake. In game one on February 22, 2011 in Columbus Crew Stadium, Burse went on to post a shutout in the 0-0 stalemate.  He was named the player of the match via text message voting by fans.  On March 15, 2011 he was released by the Crew. On March 29, 2011 it was announced that the Puerto Rico Islanders of the North American Soccer League had signed Burse for the 2011 season.  This season proved to be a tremendous comeback for Burse.  He anchored the Islanders' defense to one of the best goals against average in the league and a play off berth.

Personal life
He is the oldest of the three sons of Raymond Burse.

References

External links

1984 births
Living people
American soccer players
Association football goalkeepers
Ohio State Buckeyes men's soccer players
Chicago Fire U-23 players
FC Dallas players
Portland Timbers (2001–2010) players
Columbus Crew players
Puerto Rico Islanders players
North Carolina FC players
People from Oldham County, Kentucky
Soccer players from Louisville, Kentucky
USL League Two players
Major League Soccer players
USL First Division players
North American Soccer League players
St. Xavier High School (Louisville) alumni
FC Dallas draft picks